Marius Andrei Mocanu (born 10 July 2003) is a Romanian professional footballer who plays as a forward for Italian  club Avellino.

Career
Mocanu made his senior debut for Avellino on 16 March 2022, in a 1–0 Serie C win over Taranto.

Career statistics

References

2003 births
Living people
Romanian footballers
Association football forwards
Serie C players
U.S. Avellino 1912 players
Romanian expatriate footballers
Romanian expatriate sportspeople in Italy
Expatriate footballers in Italy